Since the inception of the FIFA Club World Cup in 2000, four players from four countries have scored three goals (a hat-trick) or more in a single match on four occasions for three clubs from two leagues. The first player to achieve the feat was Luis Suárez, who scored three times for Barcelona in a 3–0 victory over Guangzhou Evergrande on 17 December 2015.

Notable hat-tricks 
 Luis Suárez was the first player to score a hat-trick in FIFA Club World Cup competition. He scored a hat-trick in the 2015 semi-finals against Guangzhou Evergrande.
 Cristiano Ronaldo is the only player to score a hat-trick in the final of the competition. He scored a hat-trick in the 2016 final against Kashima Antlers.
 Luis Suárez, Cristiano Ronaldo, Gareth Bale and Hamdou Elhouni hold the record for having scored the only hat-tricks in the competition's history.
 Real Madrid is the only club to score more than one hat-trick, with both of their hat-tricks coming against Kashima Antlers, in 2016 and 2018.
 Kashima Antlers is the only club to concede multiple hat-tricks, both of them to Real Madrid.

List of hat-tricks

Statistics

By player

By club

By league

By nation

References 

FIFA Club World Cup
FIFA Club World Cup records and statistics
FIFA Club World Cup